Zhang Jin (born December 1969) is a Chinese physical chemist and nanotechnologist. He serves as Professor and Deputy Dean at the College of Chemistry and Molecular Engineering, Peking University, and as Deputy Director of the National Center for Nanoscience and Technology.

Biography
Zhang was born in Wangjiayuan Township of Tongxin County, Ningxia in December 1969. He has an elder brother. He received his bachelor's and master's degrees from Lanzhou University in 1992 and 1995, respectively. He completed his doctoral work in 1998 there under the supervision of Liu Zhongfan. He conducted postdoctoral research at the University of Leeds from 1998 to 2000.

In 2000 he joined the College of Chemistry and Molecular Engineering, Peking University, becoming professor in 2006 and deputy dean in 2015. In October 2018 he was appointed deputy director of the National Center for Nanoscience and Technology.

Honours and awards
 2001 Outstanding Young Chemist Award of Chinese Chemistry Society (CCS)
 2005 New Century Excellent Talents in Universities of Ministry of Education
 2007 Natural Science of Sci-Tech Achievements in Universities (First Class; second contributor)
 2007 National Natural Science Funds for Distinguished Young Scholar
 2008 State Natural Science Award (Second Class; second contributor)
 2011 Supervisor of National Excellent Doctoral Dissertation
 2013 Cheung Kong Professorship
 2015 Fellow of the Royal Society of Chemistry (RSC)
 2017 State Natural Science Award (Second Class) 
 November 22, 2019 Member of the Chinese Academy of Sciences (CAS)

References

External links
Zhang Jin on the National Center for Nanoscience and Technology 

1969 births
People from Tongxin County
Living people
Chemists from Gansu
Alumni of the University of Leeds
Academic staff of Peking University
Members of the Chinese Academy of Sciences
Fellows of the Royal Society of Chemistry
Chinese nanotechnologists